Coptic Americans ( niremenkāmi enamerika) are American citizens of Coptic descent or persons of Coptic descent residing in the United States of America. As of 2018, there were some 500,000 Copts living in the United States.

Immigration history

The immigration of the Copts to the United States started as early as the late 1940s. After 1952, the rate of Coptic immigration from Egypt to the United States increased. The first Coptic church in the United States is St. Mark's Coptic Orthodox Church, which was established in the late 1960s in Jersey City. 

As of 2013, researchers estimated that there were about 350,000 Copts who settled in the United States before the Egyptian revolution of 2011, with up to 100,000 additional Copts who settled in the U.S. after the revolution, fleeing instability and violence in Egypt. Many came to the U.S. on grants of asylum. The new post-2011 migrants to the United States included both educated middle-class Copts and poorer, more rural Copts. As of 2018, it was estimated that a half-million Copts lived in the United States.

The historic centers of Coptic American life have been in New York, New Jersey, and Southern California.

In the 1990s, there were more than 50 Coptic congregations in the United States; by 2018, there were more than 250 Coptic congregations in the United States.

Notable people

This is a list of notable Coptic Americans, including both original immigrants who obtained American citizenship and their American descendants. 

 Nader Anise, founder of Coptic American Chamber of Commerce (Coptic Chamber) and attorney
 Halim El-Dabh, composer and ethnomusicologist
 Fadi Chehade, founder of RosettaNet
 Gamal Helal, retired interpreter and diplomat
 Raymond Ibrahim, author and commentator
 Magdi Khalil, commentator 
 Marty Makary, scientist and author
 Rami Malek, actor
 Emil Michael, businessman, former vice president of Uber
 Michael Mina, award-winning chef and restaurateur
 Dina Powell, former Deputy National Security Advisor
 Morris Sadek, attorney and activist
 Fayez Sarofim, billionaire and heir to the Sarofim family fortune
 Matthew Shenoda, poet, writer, and professor
 Bassem Youssef (FBI agent), Unit Chief in the FBI’s Counterterrorism Division
 Nabih Youssef, structural engineer

See also 
 Coptic diaspora 
 Copts
 Coptic Orthodoxy in the US
 List of Coptic Orthodox Churches in the United States
 St. Mark Coptic Orthodox Church (Jersey City, New Jersey)
 St. Abraam Coptic Orthodox Church (Woodbury, New York)
 North Africans in the United States
 Coptic Canadians
 Coptic Australians
 Copts in Sudan
 Copts in Libya
Egyptian Americans

References

External links 
https://www.unionbetweenchristians.com/2020/09/coptic-orthodox-dioceses-in-usa-2020.html

Coptic diaspora in North America
Coptic American
North Africans in the United States
Middle Eastern American
Ethnic groups in the United States